Biju Mathew is a New York-based Marxist activist-intellectual. An immigrant from India, he teaches Information Systems and American studies at Rider University (New Jersey). A veteran labor organizer, he co-founded the New York Taxi Workers Alliance, is a founding secretary of the National Taxi Workers Alliance, and president of the International Alliance of App-Based Transport Workers. As a writer, Mathew has published several academic articles as well as the 2005 book Taxi!: Cabs and Capitalism in New York City.

Immigrant/ Taxi Workers Organizing 
In 1998, Mathew cofounded the New York Taxi Workers Alliance (NYTWA), along with Bhairavi Desai, Javaid Tariq, and several others. NYTWA is currently one of the most successful new immigrant workers unions in the US with over 26,000 members in NYC. The union primarily organizes yellow medallion lease drivers and has fought several successful campaigns. In 2004, 2006, and 2012, it conducted fair hike-lease cap campaigns. In 2013-14, it set up a health and wellness fund for NYC taxi drivers. Perhaps its most historical campaign came in November 2021, when, after three years of direct action, including 15-day Hunger Strike, they reached an agreement with the City of New York and Marblegate Asset Management to restructure medallion mortgages, thereby saving many workers from falling into irretrievable debt. The campaign was widely covered in the media, including a cover story in The Nation. 

In 2011 the NYTWA and its sister organization, The Taxi Workers Alliance of Pennsylvania (TWAPA) became the founding affiliates of the National Taxi Workers Alliance (NTWA) of the AFL-CIO. The NTWA is the 57th chartered union of the AFL-CIO and the first new charter in over 50 years. The creation of NTWA is a historic event and it is the first national union of independent contractor-workers. Mathew is presently the secretary of the NTWA. 

In January 2020, Mathew cofounded the International Alliance of App Based Transport Workers (IIATW), along with delegates from 23 countries. Initially a member of the steering committee, he was made president of IAATW in 2021.

Left Political Education 
Mathew has a long record of volunteer left education work. He is most recently the cofounder and chair of the executive council of Lamakaan, an open cultural space in Hyderabad, India. He serves on the board of the Brecht Forum, NY. He is also the cofounder of Youth Solidarity Summer, a South Asian youth education summer camp.

Transnational Solidarity Campaigns 
For over three decades, Mathew has worked with various civil society groups to uphold human rights and monitor human rights violations in India. After the 2002 Gujarat riots, in which Hindu groups killed over 2,000 Muslims, Mathew and several others founded the Campaign to Stop Funding Hate (CSFH), which tracked over USD $6,000,000 being funneled to the Hindutva movement in India. This work is documented in a report titled “The Foreign Exchange of Hate” published. CSFH has also investigated and published a report, “Unmistakably Sangh” on Hindutva student organizations in the US. In 2005, he helped found the Coalition Against Genocide (CAG), a coalition of 40 organizations dedicated to fighting for minority rights in India, especially for justice for the victims of the 2002 Gujarat riots. 

Mathew is also the cofounder of the Mining Zone Peoples Solidarity Group (MZPSG) that works on solidarity campaigns to support peoples movements against indiscriminate mining and consequent displacement in India. MZPSG currently works on a solidarity campaign for the anti-Posco campaign in India. Its report, documents the inconsistencies in the claims of Posco India, the government of India, and the government of Orissa, in justifying the USD $12 000 000 Posco-India project. 

In 2020, Mathew co-founded India Civil Watch International, a membership based civil rights monitoring and campaign organization based out of North America, which has over 200 members at present. ICWI has mounted campaigns to hold Facebook responsible for hate speech on its India platforms, fight for the release of the activists detained as part of the Bhima-Koregaon conspiracy, among others. Mathew is present co-chair of ICWI.

Media and Publications 
Mathew has authored numerous scholarly as well as journalistic publications on subjects ranging from labor to neoliberalism to communal violence. In 2005, he published Taxi! Cabs and Capitalism in New York City with The New Press. The book, which draws heavily on Mathew's interaction with drivers, details the taxi workers' struggles in New York City from the 1920s to the present as well as discussing New York politics and policies and their effects on the taxi industry. It was widely praised in publications including the Financial Times and has been heralded as a classic. It was republished in a new edition by Cornell University Press in 2008. 

Between 1999 and 2011, Mathew hosted a weekly radio show for the WBAI station titled "Global Movements, Urban Struggles." It featured discussions with activists fighting for racial and economic justice around the world.

References

Indian emigrants to the United States
American Marxists
American political writers
American male non-fiction writers
Indian Marxists
21st-century Indian essayists
Indian Marxist writers
Rider University faculty
Year of birth missing (living people)
Living people